"Faces of Stone" is a single by English rock musician and former Pink Floyd member David Gilmour, and the third track on his fourth solo studio album, Rattle That Lock. It was released as a single on 6 November 2015, with the album being released on 18 September 2015 by Columbia Records. The song lyrics and music were composed by Gilmour.

Music Video
On 27 October 2015, the song released an official music video on mortality and the cycle of life, through Gilmour's official YouTube channel that was directed by Aubrey Powell of Hipgnosis, combines footage of David filmed at his Medina studio with archive footage from the 1944 silent experimental short At Land featuring surrealist filmmaker Maya Deren.

Personnel
Musicians
 David Gilmour – vocals, guitars, keyboards, piano, production, acoustical engineering, mixing
 Phil Manzanera – hammond organ, acoustic guitar, keyboard elements, production
 Damon Iddins – Accordion, calliope elements
 Steve DiStanislao – drums, percussion
 Danny Cummings – percussion
 Eira Owen – horn
 Zbigniew Preisner – orchestration and orchestral arrangements
 Robert Ziegler – conducting orchestra
 Rolf Wilson – orchestra leader

Production
 Andy Jackson – engineering, mixing, choir registration
 Damon Iddins – technical assistance, choir registration
 Mike Boddy – additional sound engineering at Gallery Studios
 Andres Mesa – technical assistance
 Geoff Foster – engineering orchestral parts
 Laurence Anslow, John Prestage – technical assistance
 James Guthrie – mastering

References

External links
 
 

2015 singles
2015 songs
Songs written by David Gilmour
Song recordings produced by David Gilmour